Günther Wolfgang Bahr (18 July 1921 – 29 April 2009) was a German Luftwaffe fighter pilot and night fighter flying ace during World War II. He claimed 36 victories at night, plus one further daytime aerial victory, all of which were four-engine bombers, achieved in over 90 combat missions. He counted 37 victories over all. He was also a recipient of the Knight's Cross of the Iron Cross. Bahr died in April 2009 at the age of 87.

Career
Bahr was born on 18 July 1921 in Neu-Legden, a small settlement northeast of Königsberg, East Prussia, present-day part of Dobroje in the Kaliningrad Oblast. On 19 December 1941, he was posted to 6. Staffel (6th squadron) of Schnellkampfgeschwader 210 (SKG 210—210th Fast-Bomber Wing) which was fighting on the Eastern Front. In January 1942, SKG 210 became Zerstörergeschwader 1 (ZG 1—1st Destroyer Wing). In consequence, Bahr served with 6. Staffel of ZG 1.

Night fighting

Following the 1939 aerial Battle of the Heligoland Bight, bombing missions by the Royal Air Force (RAF) shifted to the cover of darkness, initiating the Defence of the Reich campaign. By mid-1940, Generalmajor (Brigadier General) Josef Kammhuber had established a night air defense system dubbed the Kammhuber Line. It consisted of a series of control sectors equipped with radars and searchlights and an associated night fighter. Each sector, named a Himmelbett (canopy bed), would direct the night fighter into visual range with target bombers. In 1941, the Luftwaffe started equipping night fighters with airborne radar such as the Lichtenstein radar. This airborne radar did not come into general use until early 1942.

In late March 1942, Bahr began training as a night fighter pilot and was then transferred to the I. Gruppe (1st group) of Nachtjagdgeschwader 1 (NJG 1—1st Night Fighter Wing). On the night of 23/24 August 1943, the RAF targeted Berlin with 727 Avro Lancaster, Handley Page Halifax, Short Stirling and de Havilland Mosquito bombers, losing 57 aircraft in the attack. Defending against this mission, Bahr claimed his first nocturnal aerial victories over a Halifax and Stirling bomber. Bomber Command targeted Hanover on the night of 18/19 October. On 3/4 November, Bomber Command's main target was Düsseldorf, hit by 577 bombers and 12 Mosquitos. That night, the RAF lost 18 bombers with further 37 damaged.

On the night of 20/21 December 1943, the RAF targeted Frankfurt am Main. Defending against this attack, Bahr claimed three Halifax bombers, two of which may have been from No. 10 Squadron. On the night of 21/22 February 1945, Bahr became an "ace-in-a-day". That night, the RAF had targeted Duisburg, Worms and the Mittelland Canal. Bahr, flying a Messerschmitt Bf 110 G with his crew, radio operator Feldwebel Arno Rehmer and air gunner Unteroffizier Kurt Riediger, were vectored to the bomber stream heading for Worms and shot down seven bombers. That night, the RAF lost 34 aircraft, 26 of which were credited to Bahr, Heinz-Wolfgang Schnaufer, Heinz Rökker and Johannes Hager. Bahr was awarded the Knight's Cross of the Iron Cross on 28 March 1945.

With the German Air Force
Following World War II, Bahr rejoined military service with the German Air Force, at the time referred to as the Bundesluftwaffe, in 1962. As a Major (major), he retired in 1975. Bahr died in April 2009.

Summary of career

Aerial victory claims
According to Spick, Bahr was credited with 36 nocturnal aerial victories claimed in approximately 90 nocturnal combat missions, plus one further daytime claim. Foreman, Mathews and Parry, authors of Luftwaffe Night Fighter Claims 1939 – 1945, list 36 nocturnal victory claims, numerically ranging from 2 to 37. Mathews and Foreman also published Luftwaffe Aces — Biographies and Victory Claims, listing Bahr with 35 claims, plus two further unconfirmed claims.

Awards
 Iron Cross (1939) 2nd and 1st Class
 Honour Goblet of the Luftwaffe on 15 May 1944 as Feldwebel and pilot
 German Cross in Gold on 13 June 1944 as Oberfeldwebel in the 3./Nachtjagdgeschwader 6
 Knight's Cross of the Iron Cross on 28 March 1945 Oberfeldwebel and pilot in the I./Nachtjagdgeschwader 6

Notes

References

Citations

Bibliography

 
 
 
 
 
 
 
 
 
 
 
 
 
 

1921 births
2009 deaths
Luftwaffe pilots
German World War II flying aces
German Air Force personnel
Recipients of the Gold German Cross
Recipients of the Knight's Cross of the Iron Cross
People from Bartoszyce County
People from East Prussia